Where Do We Go From Here? is a World War I song written by Howard Johnson and composed by Percy Wenrich. The song was first published in 1917 by Leo Feist, Inc., in New York, NY. The sheet music cover features a photo of Collins and Harlin.

The sheet music can be found at the Pritzker Military Museum & Library.

References

Bibliography
Parker, Bernard S. World War I Sheet Music Vol 2. Jefferson: McFarland & Company, Inc., 2007. . 
 Tyler, Don. Music of the First World War.Santa Barbara, California : Greenwood. 2016.  
Vogel, Frederick G. World War I Songs: A History and Dictionary of Popular American Patriotic Tunes, with Over 300 Complete Lyrics. Jefferson: McFarland & Company, Inc., 1995. . 

1917 songs
Songs of World War I
Songs with music by Percy Wenrich
Songs with lyrics by Howard Johnson (lyricist)